Sold Out is limited edition EP by the swing revival band Squirrel Nut Zippers that was released in 1997. The album contains live songs and other obscure tracks.

Track listing 
 "St. Louis Cemetery Blues" (Mathus)  – 3:32
 "Bedlam Ballroom (Live)" (Guess)  – 2:40
 "Pallin' With Al (Live)" (Maxwell)  – 2:49
 "La Grippe (Live)" (Matthus)  – 6:57
 "I Raise Hell" (Jones)  – 5:00
 "Fell to Pieces" (Mathus) – 3:38

Hidden tracks 
These appear after a period of silence on the "Fell to Pieces" (12:48) track.

 "Pippo's Circus Theme" – 1:47
 "Santa Claus Is Smoking Reefer" – 2:06 
 "If You Were Mine (Live)" – 3:16

Details 
 "St. Louis Cemetery Blues" was intended for Perennial Favorites and features Andrew Bird on violin.
 A studio version of "Bedlam Ballroom" later appeared on 2000 album of the same name.
 Jingles from the Squirrel Brand Candy Company are featured after "Bedlam Ballroom" and "I Raise Hell."
 "Fell to Pieces" was reportedly recorded at the Zippers's second practice session in 1993.

Personnel 
 Jimbo Mathus – vocals, guitar, tenor banjo, piano
 Tom Maxwell – vocals, guitar, bass clarinet, baritone saxophone
 Katharine Whalen – vocals, banjo, ukulele
 Ken Mosher – alto and baritone saxophone, bass, drums, vocals
 Stacy Guess – trumpet
 Je Widenhouse – trumpet
 Stu Cole – bass
 Don Raleigh – bass
 Chris Phillips – drums, percussion

Additional personnel 
 Andrew Bird – violin
 Hawkeye – mandolin
 The band Bio Ritmo appears on "La Grippe". Bio Ritmo includes:
 Rene Herrera – vocals
 Matt Paddock – alto saxophone
 Bob Miller – trumpet
 Giustino Riccio – timbales
 Gabo Tomasini – congas/percussion
 Jim Thomson – percussion
 Clay Walker - sound recordist on "Pallin' with Al" and "I Raise Hell"

References

1997 albums
Squirrel Nut Zippers albums